"Joy's Address" is a song by the English post-punk band Float Up CP. It is the only single released in support of their 1985 album Kill Me in the Morning.

Formats and track listing 
All songs written by Gareth Sager.
UK 7" single (RT 150)
"Joy's Address" – 3:39
"Desert Heart" – 2:52

UK 12" single (RTT 150)
"Joy's Address" – 5:29
"Desert Heart" – 2:52

Accolades

Personnel
Adapted from the Joy's Address liner notes.

Float Up CP
 Neneh Cherry – vocals
 Ollie Moore – saxophone
 Sean Oliver – bass guitar, backing vocals, production
 Gareth Sager – guitar, keyboards, vocals, production, design
 Bruce Smith – drums

Additional musicians
 David Defries – trumpet
 Derek Goddard – drums
Production and additional personnel
 Neville Brody – design
 Ben Rogan – engineering

Charts

Release history

References

External links 
 

1984 songs
1984 singles
Rough Trade Records singles
Songs written by Gareth Sager